Shiroka is a village located near Shkodër, Albania. It is the birthplace of Anton Harapi.

References

External links
History of Shiroka (Top Channel Documentary)

People from Shiroka
Anton Harapi

Populated places in Shkodër